The 2014 League of Legends World Championship was an esports tournament held from September 18 to October 19, 2014, for the multiplayer online battle arena video game League of Legends. It was the fourth iteration of the League of Legends World Championship, an annual international tournament organized by the game's developer, Riot Games. Matches were held in Taipei, Singapore, Busan, and Seoul, with grand finals being at the Seoul World Cup Stadium in Seoul, South Korea. The 16 teams qualified by either winning a major professional league or a regional qualifying tournament. There was a 16 team round-robin group stage followed by an 8 team single elimination bracket. The games were officially streamed on Twitch and Azubu in several languages and the finals were aired online on ESPN3.

The group stage began September 18 in Taipei at the National Taiwan University Sports Center and concluded September 28 in Singapore at the Singapore EXPO with eight teams advancing to the bracket stage. The bracket stage started on October 3 in Busan, South Korea at the Busan Exhibition and Convention Center, and concluded on October 19 with the grand finals hosted at the 45,000-seats Seoul World Cup Stadium, where South Korean team Samsung Galaxy White beat the Chinese team Star Horn Royal Club to become the 2014 League of Legends world champions.

American band Imagine Dragons contributed the theme song "Warriors" for the tournament, and performed live on the grand finals stage in South Korea. All games were made available for free via live streaming.

The 2014 World Championship games were streamed live by 40 broadcast partners, and cast in 19 languages. The grand finals were watched by 27 million people, with concurrent viewership peaking at over 11 million viewers.

Teams 
The following teams qualified to participate in the tournament's group stage:

Venues 
Taipei, Singapore, Busan and Seoul were the 4 venues chosen to host the competition.

Group stage 
The group stage was played in a best of one double round-robin format, with the top two teams from each of the four groups advancing to the knockout stage, for a total of eight teams.

Group A

Group B

Group C

Group D

Knockout stage

Final standings

Viewership and attendance
Around 40,000 fans attended the grand finals between Samsung White and Star Horn Royal Club. It is estimated that there were 288 million cumulative views throughout the entire tournament.

The 2014 World Championship games were streamed live by 40 broadcast partners, and cast in 19 languages. The grand finals were watched by 27 million people, with concurrent viewership peaking at over 11 million viewers.

Racism incident
Prior to the World Championship group stage in Taipei, SK Gaming's Dennis "Svenskeren" Johnsen acted in a racially insensitive way while playing on the Taiwanese server, being disrespectful towards other players and naming his account "TaipeiChingChong". Johnsen was fined US$2,500 and was suspended from his team's first three games in the tournament.

References

External links 
 Information

League of Legends World Championship, 2014
League of Legends World Championship, 2014
League of Legends World Championship, 2014
League of Legends World Championship, 2014
League of Legends World Championship
League of Legends World Championship
League of Legends World Championship
Racism in sport
2010s in Seoul
2014 in South Korea
2014 multiplayer online battle arena tournaments